Alejandro Velasco Astete International Airport   is an international airport located in the city of Cusco, in southeastern Peru. Cusco, a principal tourist attraction in Latin America, receives various domestic flights as well as some international flights. The runway is completely paved. It operates at limited capacity due to its precarious location near the city's center. Despite these limitations, the airport has consistently ranked as Peru's second most important air terminal, handling 3,209,153 national and international passengers in 2016, as reported by CORPAC.

Name 
It was named in honor of the Peruvian pilot Alejandro Velasco Astete who was the first aeroplane pilot to cross the Andes in 1925. This first flight was from Lima directly to Cusco. Later that year, in September, while trying to avoid crashing into spectators at an airshow in the city of Puno he crashed and was killed. In recognition of his pioneering achievements in Peruvian aviation history, the airport was named in his honor.

History 
The airport began service in December 1964. It was served by American Airlines from New York City on a JFK-LIM-CUZ-LIM-JFK routing from 1998 to 1999 using Boeing 757-200 aircraft. However, these flights were discontinued due to a number of factors, including the airport's limited services and facilities, as well as the Peruvian government's refusal to grant passenger transportation rights between Lima and Cuzco. American still holds the rights to this route and can resume flights at the company's discretion.

On February 3, 2017, President Kuczynski announced the beginning of the construction of the new Chinchero International Airport, which will be located in the suburb of Chinchero, 30 minutes from Cusco city. It is estimated that the new airport, will be completed by 2025 when Velasco Astete Airport will be closed. It is expected to receive up to 6 million passengers upon its opening.

Design 
The airport has a number of amenities to service the multitude of tourists which visit the city of Cusco. A number of years ago, it was the first Peruvian airport to make use of jetways. The runway is paved and is 3400 meters (11,155 feet) long and 45 meters (148 feet) wide. The long length of the runway is due of the elevation of the airport. The thin/less dense air requires aircraft to use more runway length to generate wing lift.  Engine power generation is reduced for the same reasons, less dense air, less thrust from the engines than at lower elevations.  Climb-outs are much more slow and shallow than at lower elevation airports.

Airlines and destinations

Statistics

Access 
Taxi services are located just outside of the landing area. Rates are provided at the moment of the deal depending on both the number of passengers and the final destinations. Shuttle options for transportation include Cusco Airport Shuttle and Cusco Shuttle

Accident

On August 9, 1970, LANSA Flight 502, a four-engine Lockheed L-188A Electra turboprop, crashed shortly after takeoff from the Cusco airport, killing 99 of the 100 people on board, plus two people on the ground, in the second deadliest accident in Peru's aviation history to that date. 49 of the passengers were high school exchange students visiting Peru from Buffalo, New York. Investigation revealed the accident was caused by improper piloting technique and poor maintenance. The airline was suspended and fined by the Peruvian government. A memorial — a large white cross with a nameplate — has been erected for the victims near the crash site, about a mile and a half west-north-west from the airport.

References

External links
  Satellite view by Google Earth

Airports in Peru
Buildings and structures in Cusco